Riverhill  may refer to:

 Riverhill House, a manor house and gardens in Kent, England
 Riverhill School, a private, non-parochial school in Alabama, United States
 Riverhill Software, a Japanese video game manufacturer